Warrington's Own Buses is a municipal bus company which operates a network of services within the Borough of Warrington and the surrounding area, including Altrincham, Leigh, Earlestown, Wigan, Halton, Bolton and Northwich.

The company previously traded as Warrington Borough Transport up until 2006 and as Network Warrington between 2006 and 2018. With the launch of the 'Cheshire Cats' brand in 2018 the company rebranded as Warrington's Own Buses.

History
Warrington Corporation Tramways started operating a network of five radial tramways from the town centre in 1902, with the first motor bus service starting in 1913. Buses replaced trams on routes starting in 1931, with the infrastructure starting to require major renewal which could not be justified economically. The last tram operated in 1935.

Services expanded rapidly after the Second World War as new housing estates grew in areas such as Orford and Great Sankey. The conversion of bus routes with conductors into one-man operated services began in 1965.

Warrington was designated as a new town in 1968, which led to new housing estates planned in the Birchwood and Westbrook areas of town. As such, Warrington Borough Council Transport Department started operating new services to these new developments as they started to grow in the 1970s and beyond. The department also began operating new services jointly with Crosville upon the split of the old Stockport based North Western Road Car Company in 1972.

To comply with the Transport Act 1985, Warrington Borough Transport was incorporated in 1986. The company's mission was that if money could be made by operating services deemed uneconomic by other operators, then it should assume operation. This policy led to an increase in services operated as other bus companies who ran into the area decided to concentrate on their own core areas.

Competition from other operators flared up in 1995, with Warrington Goldlines, part of the North Western bus company, duplicating the vast majority of the existing bus network and to a lesser extent MTL's Lancashire Travel subsidiary who focused on a core of 4-5 routes in the Callands and Westbrook areas near its St Helens depot in the South West of the town. In retaliation to MTL & North Western, Warrington Borough Transport commenced operating services to places such as Wigan, St Helens, Widnes, Runcorn, Chester and Liverpool, as well as commencing a local minibus service in Northwich. This level of competition reduced by the Autumn of 1996 when MTL had withdrawn its Warrington services, North Western's Warrington operations scaled back and Warrington's competing services pretty much withdrawn.

After eighteen months of intense competition, both companies agreed a truce. Warrington Borough Transport kept routes to Prescot and St Helens, whilst giving up operations in the Birchwood area of town, which were operated by North Western. North Western was rebranded as Arriva North West in 1997.

In February 2002, Arriva North West decided to close its depot in Warrington and transferred the interurban routes to depots in Liverpool and St Helens. Warrington Borough Transport resumed operation of town routes to Birchwood, Cinnamon Brow and Woolston, but transferred the St Helens route back to Arriva. Further withdrawals by Arriva led to the takeover of routes to Leigh in 2005 and Altrincham in 2006.

In 2006, the company was rebranded and became known as Network Warrington, with a new livery designed by Samantha Beeley. However, this did lead to a streamlining of other routes, both long distance and in the town centre, which were operated with increased frequencies to shorten journey times.

Budget cuts by Warrington Borough Council resulted in evening services being reduced and Sunday evening services being completely withdrawn from 27 June 2010, as these services no longer received any subsidy from the council.

In April 2018, the company was rebranded as Warrington's Own Buses.

Routes
Warrington's Own Buses operate 96 routes across the Warrington borough, Cheshire and Greater Manchester. With 50 of them being school/college contract routes.

Ticket types
Warrington's Own Buses offer a wide range of ticket options for passengers, including singles, returns and all day tickets. Smartcard ticketing is also available for periods up to one year.

Offices and depot

The main depot and offices for Warrington's Own Buses are located on Wilderspool Causeway at the junction with Chester Road

The two main sheds to the rear of the site were originally built in 1943 for Fairey Aviation and used to assemble wings for their Fulmar bomber until they were purchased by Warrington Corporation in 1947. This site eventually became the main operational centre, with the frontage of the depot dating from 1964. The ground floor consists of a reception area and vehicle inspection bays, with the company's offices on the upper floor.

The Travel Centre on the main concourse at Warrington Bus Interchange provides for season ticket sales and information. This was known locally as “Fiona’s Travel Shop until 2021”. Other facilities are located here for driving and supervisory staff maintaining the daily operational procedures of the buses and route operations.

Former
The original tram system was operated from an eight-track depot at the junction of Mersey Street and Lower Bank Street. A purpose built bus garage was constructed on Lower Bank Street in 1930, although buses were also housed in the old tram sheds following the withdrawal of trams. Despite the move to the new Wilderspool garage, the old staff canteen on Lower Bank Street remained in use until the opening of the new bus station in 1979. The building was demolished in 1981 and is today the site of a DW Sports Fitness Club.

Future 
A new state of the art depot is due to replace the current Wilderspool Causeway depot in April 2023, located on Dallam Lane, closer to the main Warrington Interchange.

Fleet

As at July 2022, Warrington's Own Buses' fleet consists of 110 vehicles. The fleet is entirely low floor and the majority of vehicles in the fleet are single deck, with the oldest single decker vehicle type being the Daf SB120 Wright Cadet midibus, of which there are 20 examples. The majority of single decker buses are the newest buses in the fleet date from 2018.

Other single deck types in service are the integral Alexander Dennis Enviro200 (25 of these vehicles in the fleet, 13 of them being Enviro200 MMC’s) Optare Versa (10 of these vehicles in the fleet, 6 being Versa Hybrid’s) the Wright Eclipse 2-bodied Volvo B7RLE (19 of these vehicles in the fleet) with the latter being the company's largest single deckers. On the double deck side of the fleet, Warrington's Own Buses operate ten
Volvo B7TLs (three of these being dual door which are used on school routes) and eight DAF/VDL DB250s. The company also has thirteen Alexander Dennis Enviro 400s. All three types feature bodywork from either Alexander Dennis, East Lancs or Wrightbus.

Additionally, the company also maintains a heritage vehicle, a Leyland PD2/40 from 1965, used for special occasions and also available for private hire..

On the 24th of December 2019, the company obtained 2 Alexander Dennis Enviro 400City which have been in service since January 2020.

The company is expected to replace its existing fleet with new electric buses during late 2023 as part of the ZEBRA initiative.

Branding
Including the standard fleet livery, which updated in 2018, Warrington's Own Buses has a wide range of branding, which include route specific and advertising liveries.

Dedicated route liveries include:
 Connect17 – routes 17/17A.
 The Cheshire Cat – routes CAT5, CAT6, CAT7, CAT8 and CAT9 (including variants).
 The Pops – routes 20/21.
 Blueline - route 32

There is also a wide range of historical branding and liveries, which include the town's traditional dark red and ivory two-tone livery dating from 1945, with the dark red continuing to feature after the company's 2006 and 2018 re-brands. Some of company's former brands include Super Midi, Super Mini, MidiLines and Centrelink.

Gallery

See also
 Transport in Warrington
 List of bus operators of the United Kingdom
 List of preserved Warrington buses

References

Bibliography

External links
 Warrington's Own Buses official website

Bus operators in Cheshire
Bus operators in Greater Manchester
Bus operators in Merseyside
Companies based in Warrington
Transport companies established in 1902
Transport in Warrington
Companies owned by municipalities of England
1902 establishments in England